Kota is a language of the Dravidian language family with about 9000 native speakers in the Nilgiri hills of Tamil Nadu state, India. It is spoken mainly by the tribal Kota people. In the late 19th century, the native speaking population was about 1,100. In 1990, the population was only 930, out of an ethnic population of perhaps 1,400, despite the great increase in the population of the area.  The language is 'critically endangered' due to the greater social status of neighbouring languages. The Kota language may have originated from Tamil-Kannada and is closely related to Toda. The Kota population is about 2500. The origin of the name Kota is derived from the Dravidian root word 'Ko' meaning Mountain.

Phonology

Vowels 

Kota notably doesn't have central vowels like the other Nilgiri languages, Toda, the closest language also has it.

Consonants

[] and [] occur in free variation with // and //. [] occurs as an allophone of // before retroflexes.

References

Further reading

Emeneau, M.B. 1944. Kota Texts California: University of California Press.

External links
Olympic Song Practice Session in Kota Language & Style
The hare in the moon and eclipses of the moon 
Kota Swedesh List

Agglutinative languages
Endangered languages of India
Dravidian languages